{{Album ratings
| rev1      = AllMusic
| rev1Score = <ref>{{AllMusic|class=album|id=r426939|tab=review|last=Little|first=Patrick|label=J-Tull Dot Com}}</ref>
| rev2 = The Encyclopedia of Popular Music| rev2Score = 
| rev3      = Jam!
| rev3Score = (mixed)
| rev4      = Mojo
| rev4Score = (favourable)

}}J-Tull Dot Com is the 20th studio album by the British band Jethro Tull, released in 1999 on Papillon, the Chrysalis Group's late 1990s heritage record label. It was released four years after their 1995 album Roots to Branches and continues in the same vein, marrying hard rock with Eastern music influences. It is the first album to feature Jonathan Noyce on bass, who would remain with the band until 2007 in Jethro Tull's longest ever unchanged line-up. This was the last Jethro Tull album to feature all original, new material for 23 years (until the release of The Zealot Gene in 2022), although the band did release a Christmas album in 2003, which contained a mixture of new material, re-recordings of Tull's own suitably themed material and arrangements of traditional Christmas music.

Track listing

 On some versions of the CD there is a period of silence after "A Gift of Roses", followed by the title track of Anderson's (at the time unreleased) solo album The Secret Language of Birds''. The track is preceded by a brief spoken word introduction by Anderson. This extends the length of "A Gift of Roses" to 9:16.

Personnel
Jethro Tull
 Ian Anderson – vocals, flute, acoustic guitar, bouzouki
 Martin Barre – acoustic guitar, electric guitar
 Jonathan Noyce – bass guitar
 Andrew Giddings – piano, keyboards, Hammond organ, accordion
 Doane Perry – drums, percussion

Additional personnel

 Najma Akhtar – backing vocals (on "Dot Com")

Charts

References

External links
 
 Ground and Sky review
 Progressive World review
 January 2000 Interview

1999 albums
Jethro Tull (band) albums
Varèse Sarabande albums
Albums produced by Ian Anderson